Pterostylis mutica, commonly known as the midget greenhood,  is a plant in the orchid family Orchidaceae and is endemic to Australia, occurring in all states but not the Northern Territory. There is a rosette of leaves at the base of the flowering stem and up to fifteen pale green flowers which have a sensitive labellum.

Description
Pterostylis mutica, is a terrestrial,  perennial, deciduous, herb with an underground tuber. The dorsal sepal and petals are joined to form a hood called the "galea" over the column. The galea is curved with a pointed tip turning downwards. Flowering occurs from July to December.

Taxonomy and naming
Pterostylis mutica was first formally described in 1810 by Robert Brown from a specimen collected near Port Jackson and the description was published in Prodromus Florae Novae Hollandiae et Insulae Van Diemen. The specific epithet (mutica) is a Latin word meaning "shortened" or "docked" referring to the blunt petals and sepals.

Distribution and habitat
Pterostylis mutica is widespread and often common, growing in a wide range of habitats from near the coast to mountains, but usually in well-drained soil. It tolerates dry conditions, poor soil and exposed positions. It is widespread in New South Wales and Victoria and also occurs in south-east Queensland, south-eastern South Australia and the south-west of Western Australia. There is doubt about its presence in Tasmania

Ecology
The labellum of P. mutica is attractive to a species of gnat which lands on the labellum and grasps the dark green appendage. When it does so, the labellum springs upward, trapping the insect inside the now-closed flower. The gnat can now only escape by pushing between "wings" on the sides of the column. As it does so, it either removes a pollinium or deposits one from a previously-visited flower of the same species, and pollination occurs.

References

mutica
Endemic orchids of Australia
Orchids of New South Wales
Orchids of Queensland
Orchids of South Australia
Orchids of Tasmania
Orchids of Victoria (Australia)
Plants described in 1810